Unit Operations of Chemical Engineering, first published in 1956, is one of the oldest chemical engineering textbooks still in widespread use. The current Seventh Edition, published in 2004, continues its successful tradition of being used as a textbook in university undergraduate chemical engineering courses. It is widely used in colleges and universities throughout the world, and often referred just "McCabe-Smith-Harriott" or "MSH".

Subjects covered in the book

The book starts with an introductory chapter devoted to definitions and principles.  It then follows with 28 additional chapters, each covering a principal chemical engineering unit operation. The 28 chapters are grouped into four major sections:

 Fluid mechanics
 Heat transfer
 Mass transfer and equilibrium stages
 Operations involving particulate solids.

A more detailed table of contents is available on the Internet.

See also

Chemical engineer
:Category:Unit operations
Distillation Design
Perry's Chemical Engineers' Handbook
Process design
Transport Phenomena
Unit operations

References

Chemical engineering books
Engineering textbooks
Unit operations
1956 books